Selank (Russian: Cеланк) is a nootropic, anxiolytic peptide based drug developed by the Institute of Molecular Genetics of the Russian Academy of Sciences. Selank is a heptapeptide with the sequence Thr-Lys-Pro-Arg-Pro-Gly-Pro (TKPRPGP).  It is a synthetic analogue of human tuftsin.

Pharmacology
Selank is a synthetic analogue of the immunomodulatory peptide tuftsin; as such, it mimics many of its effects. It has been shown to modulate the expression of Interleukin-6 (IL-6) and affect the balance of T helper cell cytokines. It has been shown to influence the concentration of monoamine neurotransmitters and induce metabolism of serotonin. Selank has also been found to rapidly elevate the expression of brain-derived neurotrophic factor (BDNF) in the hippocampus of rats.

Selank, as well as a related peptide drug, Semax, have been found to inhibit enzymes involved in the degradation of enkephalins and other endogenous regulatory peptides, and this action may be involved in their effects. It has also been found to affect the activity of carboxypeptidase H and phenylmethylsulfonylfluoride-inhibited carboxypeptidase in rat nervous system tissue.

Selank has been found to produce antidepressant-like effects in animal models of depression and anhedonia.

Clinical trials
In clinical trials, the drug has shown to provide a sustained nootropic and anxiolytic effect which is useful for the treatment of generalized anxiety disorder (GAD). Selank has an advantage over traditional anxiety treatments, such as benzodiazepines, as it has no sedating or negative cognitive side effects and no associated addiction or withdrawal problems.

Selank is closely related to another nootropic drug, Semax, also developed by the Institute of Molecular Genetics in Russia. This drug is currently available in Russian and Ukrainian pharmacies.

As with all lyophilized peptides, it needs refrigeration to remain stable within sterile water solutions, such as bacteriostatic water concentrations.

See also
 Afobazole
 Mebicar
 Semax
 Bemethyl

References

External links
 Selank instructions

Anxiolytics
Drugs with unknown mechanisms of action
Enkephalinase inhibitors
Nootropics
Peptides
Russian drugs